Ronicel Fortes Andrade Santos (born 10 January 1995), better known as Rony Santos, is a Cape Verdean professional footballer who plays as a defender for FC Azzurri 90 LS in Switzerland.

Professional career
Santos joined the Benfica academy in 2012 from Cape Verde, and joined Nacional in 2014.

In February 2019, Santos joined FC Azzurri 90 LS in Switzerland.

International career
Santos made his debut for the Cape Verde national football team in a 0-0 (4-3) penalty shootout win over Andorra on 3 June 2018.

References

External links
 
 
 Maisfutebol Profile

1995 births
Living people
People from Mindelo
Cape Verdean footballers
Cape Verde international footballers
Campeonato de Portugal (league) players
Championnat National players
A Lyga players
C.D. Trofense players
Batuque FC players
FK Jonava players
Association football defenders
Cape Verdean expatriate footballers
Cape Verdean expatriate sportspeople in Portugal
Cape Verdean expatriate sportspeople in France
Cape Verdean expatriate sportspeople in Switzerland
Cape Verdean expatriate sportspeople in Lithuania
Expatriate footballers in Portugal